The N. G. Arfaras Sponge Packing House is a historic site in Tarpon Springs, Florida. It is located at 26 West Park Street. On April 10, 1991, it was added to the U.S. National Register of Historic Places.

See also
 E. R. Meres Sponge Packing House

References

External links

 Pinellas County listings at National Register of Historic Places
 Headlines through the years at St. Petersburg Times Online

N. G. Arfaras Sponge Packing House
Buildings and structures in Tarpon Springs, Florida
Sponge diving